Walter J. Gorney (April 12, 1912 – March 5, 2004) was an Austrian-American actor. He was best known for his role as "Crazy" Ralph in the 1980s slasher films Friday the 13th (1980) and Friday the 13th Part 2 (1981). He returned to the series in Friday the 13th Part VII: The New Blood (1988) as the narrator.

His other film credits include Heavy Traffic (1973), King Kong (1976), and Day of the Animals (1977).

Walter's character Ralph was parodied by Robert Donner in the 1983 film Hysterical.

Gorney died in New York City on March 5, 2004, aged 91.

Filmography

References

External links
 
 
 

1912 births
2004 deaths
Male actors from New York City
American male film actors
Austrian emigrants to the United States
20th-century American male actors